Luza is a town and the administrative center of Luzsky District in Kirov Oblast, Russia, located on the Luza River (Yug's tributary),  northwest of Kirov, the administrative center of the oblast. Population:

History
Luza was established as a settlement at the railway station in the end of the 19th century on location of an older settlement, which had been known since the 17th century. Town status was granted to it in 1944.

Administrative and municipal status
Within the framework of administrative divisions, Luza serves as the administrative center of Luzsky District. As an administrative division, it is, together with thirty-six rural localities, incorporated within Luzsky District as the Town of Luza. As a municipal division, the Town of Luza is incorporated within Luzsky Municipal District as Luzskoye Urban Settlement.

Economy
Luza is a large timber-works center. There is a sawmill and a railroad tie-manufacturing plant in the town. Luza is one of the monotowns, on 2021 the biggest employer in the city is Holz House LLC. Holz House produces prefabricated glulam houses and sell glulam and lumber all over the world.

References

Notes

Sources

Cities and towns in Kirov Oblast
Monotowns in Russia